Jayme Ray White is an American public official serving as deputy United States trade representative (USTR).

Career 
White grew up in Seattle, Washington and moved to Washington D.C. to work for his hometown Representative Jim McDermott. He later worked for Senator Ron Wyden as his Chief Trade Advisor and led negotiations for the United States-Mexico-Canada Agreement (USMCA). White worked on Capitol Hill for more than 20 years prior to joining USTR.

Biden administration 
On April 16, 2021, the Biden administration announced an intent to nominate White as a deputy trade representative in the Office of the United States Trade Representative for Western Hemisphere, Europe, the Middle East, Labor, and Environment. The US Senate confirmed his nomination by an 80 - 18 vote on September 22, 2021. He was sworn in by Katherine Tai on September 27, 2021.

References 

1973 births
Living people
Biden administration personnel
People from Seattle
Georgetown University alumni